Altman is a ghost town in Teller County, Colorado, United States. Much of the town was destroyed by fire on May 24, 1903.

Geography
Altman is located at  (38.7361,-105.1339).

References

Ghost towns in Colorado
Former populated places in Teller County, Colorado